Kim Hye-min (born February 20, 1985 in Seoul, South Korea) is a retired South Korean ice dancer. She competed with brother Kim Min-woo. Together they were the 2003–2005 South Korean national champions. They twice placed 15th at the Four Continents Championships. Kim & Kim were coached by Igor Yaroshenko and Irina Romanova. They retired from competitive skating in 2006.

Competitive highlights
(with Kim)

References

External links
 

South Korean female ice dancers
1985 births
Living people
Figure skaters from Seoul
Figure skaters at the 2003 Asian Winter Games
Competitors at the 2005 Winter Universiade